Inapravugal is a 1965 Malayalam language film. It was directed by Kunchacko. Sharada made her debut in this movie. The movie has other notable actors like Satyan, Prem Nazir, Muthaiah, Thikkurissy Sukumaran Nair, Kottarakara Sreedharan Nair, S. P. Pillai and Pankajavalli, along with Sharada (in her major Malayalam debut).

Cast
Satyan as Anthony 
Prem Nazir as Chandy's son Rajan
T. S. Muthaiah as Kochappi 
Thikkurissy Sukumaran Nair as Chandy 
Kottarakara Sreedharan Nair as Kuncheria 
S. P. Pillai as Kutty 
Pankajavalli 
Sharada as Kuncheria's daughter Rahel (Debut)

Plot
Kochappi (Muthiah) is the neighbor of Kuncheria (Kottarakara Sreedharan Nair), a bullock cart owner. Kochappi is a ferry owner and his son Anthony (Satyan) is in love with Kuncheria's daughter Rahel (Sharada). Their parents decide to get them married according to the wish of Rahel and Anthony. Chandy (Thikkurissy Sukumaran Nair) is a rich landlord of the village and his son Rajan (Prem Nazir) returns to his village after doing his studies abroad. Rajan gets attracted to Rahel and approach her parents to express the interest to marry her. In fact Rajan was unaware of Rahel's relationship with Anthony. Chandy refuses Rajan's proposal only because Rahel is poor, but finally agreed with his sons wish. Rahel's greedy parents agrees with Rajan's proposal forgetting the promise they have made to Anthony's parents. This decision creates enmity between both families, who were once good neighbors. Rahel is helpless and unable to object. Anthony falls ill and dies on the day of Rahel's marriage with Rajan. Unable to bear the grief, she faints and dies after a few days. Rahel is cremated near the grave of Anthony.

Soundtrack
The music was composed by V. Dakshinamoorthy and the lyrics were written by Vayalar Ramavarma.

References

External links
1965 films
1960s Malayalam-language films
Films directed by Kunchacko